Karel Heyne (1877–1947) was a Dutch botanist, known for his comprehensive handbook on the useful plants of the Dutch East Indies (The useful plants of the Dutch East Indies); this was the first such handbook and became a standard reference.

Towards the end of the 19th century he settled on Java in the former Dutch East Indies. In 1900, at the age of 23, he started working for the Koninklijke Paketvaart Maatschappij (KPM). He married Wilhelmina Louise Visser (1871–1913) in 1903 and they had two sons, the first in 1905 and the second in 1906. In January 1906, Heyne was appointed chief curator of the Museum voor Economische Botanie (Museum of Economic Botany) in Buitenzorg by Melchior Treub, the then director of 's Lands Plantentuin in Buitenzorg. In January 1920 he married Ida van Oorschot (1875–1957). In 1926, Heyne resigned as curator and in April 1927 he repatriated to the Netherlands. He and his wife went to live in Bennekom, where he bought a large house.

Selected publications
 Heyne, K. 1907-1926. Jaarboek Departement van Landbouw, Handel en Nijverheid.

Eponyms
 (Zingiberaceae) Curcuma heyneana Valeton & Zijp
 (Zingiberaceae) Phaeomeria heyneana (Valeton) Burkill
 (Apocynaceae) Heynella lactea

References

1877 births
1947 deaths
Botanical writers
Dutch botanical writers
20th-century Dutch botanists
Dutch curators